Chuter is a surname. Notable people with the name include:

George Chuter (born 1976), English rugby player 
James Chuter Ede (1882–1965), British teacher, trade unionist and Labour politician
Penny Chuter (born 1942), British former international sculler, rowing coach and rowing administrator
Robert Chuter, Australian theatre director

See also
Six Chuter, American aircraft manufacturer